Mikhail Nikolaevich Matveyev (born 13 May 1968) is a Russian politician and historian. A member of the Communist Party, Matveyev represents the Promyshlenny constituency in the State Duma.

Education 
In 1992, Matveyev graduated with honors at Samara State University.

Political career 
He was elected to the State Duma in the Promyshlenny constituency in the 2021 Russian legislative election after a recount and legal challenge. In February 2022, Matveyev voted in favor of the recognition of the separatist Donetsk and Luhansk People's Republics but later spoke out against the "special military operation", stating that he had not intended the recognition to precede an offensive war.

In 2022, he officially supported the state-promoted narrative that Ukraine is governed by Banderites and "neo-Nazis", and his only criticism concerned military operations outside of Donbass.

On 12 September 2022, Matveyev proposed that Russian governors and lawmakers enlist in the Russian army as volunteers.

References 

1968 births
Living people
Politicians from Dnipro
21st-century Russian historians
21st-century Russian politicians
Eighth convocation members of the State Duma (Russian Federation)
Communist Party of the Russian Federation members
Russian activists against the 2022 Russian invasion of Ukraine
Samara State University alumni